Shuddh Desi Romance ( and released internationally as A Pure Desi Romance) is a 2013 Indian Hindi-language romantic comedy drama film directed by Maneesh Sharma and produced by Aditya Chopra. It features Sushant Singh Rajput, Parineeti Chopra and Vaani Kapoor in leading roles. The story, set in Jaipur, Rajasthan, explores the views of the younger generation on commitment, live-in relationships and arranged marriages as compared to love marriages in small town India. It screened in the Gala Presentation section of the 2013 Toronto International Film Festival. Upon release, the film received positive reviews from critics with particular praise for Chopra, Rajput and Kapoor's performances and was declared a hit in India by Box Office India.

Plot
Raghu Ram is a tourist guide in Jaipur who doubles up as a rental baraati for Goyal, a wedding planner. Raghu is experiencing pre-marital jitters before his arranged marriage. Goyal has hired a fake baraat to accompany Raghu to his wedding which includes Gayatri, an independent and open-minded woman who lives life on her own terms. On the way to his wedding venue in the bus they kiss passionately. Raghu falls for Gayatri. A confused Raghu, heavily impressed by her freedom, gathers the guts to run away from his wedding.

A fortnight later, the two begin dating and eventually enter into a live-in relationship. In India, such relationships are socially frowned upon, so they hide the relationship from their neighbours by pretending to be siblings. Mr. Gupta, a neighbour of Gayatri, catches Raghu with Gayatri and tries to create distrust between them, but the couple are able to reconcile and decide to get married. However, on the day of the wedding, Gayatri runs out on him, and Raghu is left inconsolable.

Soon after, at a wedding, Raghu meets Tara, the woman he was going to marry before he met Gayatri. She asks him out initially on a revenge trip but slowly falls for him. Just as Raghu is about to ask her to marry him at a wedding, he runs into Gayatri. The bride's mom sends Raghu and Gayatri to pick up the priest from the station. On the way, Gayatri tries to talk to Raghu but he is reluctant. Later at dinner, Raghu finds Tara and Gayatri sitting on the same table. Tara tells him that she invited Gayatri to dinner on Sunday. Raghu gingerly makes an excuse for the bathroom. Gayatri follows him, and they confess their love for each other. Tara arrives and catches them in a loving embrace. Tara realizes she doesn't love Raghu anymore and leaves without any explanation while Raghu and Gayatri are led by Goyal to accept that they love each other and that they should marry.

Three days later, on the night of their marriage, Gayatri and Raghu run into each other at the main gate while they are trying to run away. Later they meet at Gayatri's home where Raghu says that he truly loves Gayatri but he doesn't want to be imprisoned by marriage. They kiss and agree to resume their live-in relationship.

Cast
 Sushant Singh Rajput as Raghu Ram 
 Parineeti Chopra as Gayatri
 Vaani Kapoor as Tara
 Rishi Kapoor as Goyal (Tauji)
 Jitendra Parmar as Young Band Wala
 Bhuvan Arora as Raghu's Friend 1
 Rajesh Sharma as Mausa Ji
 Swapnil Kamble as Baba
 Tarun Vyas as Mr. Gupta, Gayatri's neighbour
 Anirban Narayan Chandra Chowdhury as Prabir Chatterjee
 Nalneesh Neel as Tara's suitor

Production
Scripting
The script was written by Jaideep Sahni, who has previously written such films as Company (2002), Bunty Aur Babli (2005), Khosla Ka Ghosla (2006) and Chak De! India (2007). The setting, Jaipur, was used to provide a contrast from the lifestyle of big cities and to depict how a traditional way of life complete with its hypocrisies co-exists in these smaller cities along with modern influences.

Filming
While the majority of the film was shot in and around Jaipur, Rajasthan, the title song was shot at Mehrangarh Fort and the palaces and bylanes in Jodhpur, Rajasthan with the lead actors, and choreographed by Ganesh Acharya.

Soundtrack

The soundtrack album was composed by the duo Sachin–Jigar, with lyrics were written by Jaideep Sahni. It contains four vocal songs and the remaining tracks are instrumental. The tracks have a huge Rajasthani folk influence mixed with bossa and techno. The album was released on 19 August 2013.

Release
Shuddh Desi Romance was released on 6 September 2013. It was mainly a multiplex release on approximately 1100 screens. A teaser trailer of Dhoom 3 was attached to the prints. It has an investment of  including marketing and release costs.

Marketing
The trailer was launched at Raj Mandir Cinema, Jaipur.

Yash Raj Films launched the poster with the digital poster on 17 June 2013. Sushant Singh Rajput introduced Vaani Kapoor at a song launch event on 1 August where they unveiled their song "Gulabi". The title track, "Shuddh Desi Romance" was released on 18 August 2013.

The star cast – Parineeti Chopra, Sushant Singh Rajput and Vaani Kapoor – promoted the film on 31 August 2013 in an appearance on the show Comedy Nights with Kapil. Sushant, Parineeti and Vaani promoted the film on the show DID Super Moms. The stars promoted it on Jhalak Dikhla Jaa where Sushant wooed Madhuri Dixit. Chopra and Kapoor with director Maneesh Sharma and writer Jaideep Sahni discussed the film at great length with the Indian Express team at the Screen Preview.

Reception

Critical response
The movie received generally positive reviews, with praises mainly towards Chopra, Rajput and Kapoor's performances.

India
Taran Adarsh of Bollywood Hungama gave it 3.5 stars out of 5 and stated that Shuddh Desi Romance caters to and reflects the mindset of a lot of youth in modern society. Rajeev Masand of CNN-IBN gave 3.5 out of 5 and commented that "To a large extent, Shuddh Desi Romance reinvents the wheel as far as Bollywood rom-coms go. It's aggressively non-formulaic, and gives us characters who refuse to conform. The minor hiccups notwithstanding, this is a charming little film." Tushar Joshi of DNA gave it 3 stars and felt that Shuddh Desi Romance is refreshing, breezy and engaging. India Today gave it 3.5 stars. Mohar Basu of Koimoi gave 3.5 stars and remarked that the film is a heartfelt true take of real contemporary relationships. Sukanya Verma of Rediff gave it 3.5 stars and judged that Shuddh Desi Romance has no dull moments.

Khalid Mohammad of the Deccan Chronicle gave it 3 stars and wrote, "don't miss it for Ms Chopra and for the feisty first half. Post-break, you can catch 40, even 400 winks in your seat." Reshma Sengar of Zee News gave it 2.5 stars and summarised, "Although not as good as Band Baaja Baaraat and Ladies Vs Ricky Bahl, Maneesh Sharma's third directorial venture is "jhataak", peppy and colourful but still turns out only to be a onetime watch!" Anupama Chopra gave the film 4 stars and said Shuddh Desi Romance is "a dose of adrenalin, though it loses steam in the second half – it's almost as if, suddenly, Manish and Jaideep didn't know where to take their story and characters." The Times of India gave it 3 stars and stated that "the concept is engaging, but the plot is little shudd, little desi and quite confused". Rachit Gupta of Filmfare gave it 3 stars and said that the film is a crazy, witty and a soulful twist on getting hitched.

Overseas
Dawn's film critic Mohammad Kamran Jawaid said that "Shuddh Desi Romance has an innovative twist on the love triangle, spiffy songs, a mix of adequate to engaging performances (Mr. Rajput is adequate, Ms. Chopra is engaging, Ms. Kapoor is somewhere in between) and just about apt technical intelligence that doesn’t overpower the story Mr. Sharma has in mind. So at the very least, it has a few aces up its sleeve." Jawaid, however, had a problem with the lack of morality in context of South Asian family values, writing "Young love, I can understand (and endorse) easy. Debasement of relationships to avoid public disgrace, amongst other puerilities, is a drastic measure for yours truly. The first world may disagree, but here in South Asia, it’s the orthodox bond of family that count, not the drastic need to escape its ideals."

Box office

India
The film grossed  nett across its first five days at the domestic box office. It collected around Rs 362.7 million nett in week one. Shuddh Desi Romance collected around 12.5 million nett on its 8th day. Shuddh Desi Romance dropped in its second weekend collecting nearly 60 million nett. The ten-day total is Rs 420 million nett plus. Shuddh Desi Romance had Rs 85.8 million nett second week taking its two-week total to around Rs 450 million nett. The film nett. grossed Rs 10 million in third week taking its total to  nett.

Overseas
Shuddh Desi Romance grossed $1.08 million (Rs 7.04 cr) in its first weekend overseas. Shuddh Desi Romance did well in overseas as it has collected $1.7 million in ten days. The film crossed US$ 2 million overseas in three weeks.

Awards
Filmfare Awards
Best Female Debut – Vaani Kapoor
Nominated – Best Actress – Parineeti Chopra
BIG Star Entertainment Awards
Nominated – BIG Star Most Entertaining Actor in a Romantic Role - Male – Sushant Singh Rajput
IIFA Awards
Star Debut of the Year - Female – Vaani Kapoor

See also
 List of Indian romantic films

References

External links

 
 
 

2013 films
2010s Hindi-language films
Films set in Rajasthan
Films shot in Rajasthan
2013 romantic comedy-drama films
Yash Raj Films films
Indian romantic comedy-drama films
Films shot in Mandawa
2013 comedy films
2013 drama films
Films directed by Maneesh Sharma